Paul Edward Rowe (May 5, 1914 – August 28, 1993) was an American ice hockey player who competed in the 1936 Winter Olympics.

In 1936 he was a member of the American ice hockey team, which won the bronze medal.

He died in Drexel Hill, Pennsylvania.

External links
 

1914 births
1993 deaths
American men's ice hockey left wingers
Ice hockey players at the 1936 Winter Olympics
Medalists at the 1936 Winter Olympics
Olympic bronze medalists for the United States in ice hockey
Boston University Terriers men's ice hockey players